Goniolimon speciosum, the dwarf statice (a name shared with other species) or plantain-leaved thrift, is a widespread species of flowering plant in the family Plumbaginaceae. It is native to the Eurasian steppes; southern and eastern Russia, Kazakhstan, all of Siberia, Mongolia, Inner Mongolia, and Xinjiang. It is regularly consumed by Przewalski's horses (Equus przewalskii).

References

Plumbaginaceae
Flora of East European Russia
Flora of South European Russia
Flora of Kazakhstan
Flora of Siberia
Flora of Mongolia
Flora of Inner Mongolia
Flora of Xinjiang
Plants described in 1848